Çuvaş (also, Çüvaş, Chuash, and Chuvash) is a village in the Astara Rayon of Azerbaijan. The village forms part of the municipality of Rinə.

References 

Populated places in Astara District